The Union of North African Football (UNAF;) is an association football organising body. It was launched in 2005 by the North African members of the Confederation of African Football (CAF), Algeria, Egypt, Libya, Morocco and Tunisia. The post of president will be rotated among the five founding nations.

History
The Union of North African Football (UNAF) was founded in 2005 and includes the countries of Algeria, Egypt, Libya, Morocco and Tunisia and is continued to the Confederation of African Football that have 53 national football associations distributed into 6 regions. The UNAF is the sixth region of the continent by division accredited to the CAF and the Union has presided over in the first parliamentary period immediately following its founding by Mr. Samir Zaher a former president of the Egyptian Football Association, the president is elected during a plenary session for a period of 4 years by the members of the Union and are the heads of the five unions and the president-elect proposes as his deputy from among the immediate superiors five national unions during the first meeting of an executive office following the election as General Assembly by the Executive Office to determine the heads and members of the committees.

The recent president elected is Mr. Wadii Jari, a president of the Tunisian Football Federation. He was unanimously elected chairman of the UNAF for a term of four years and during the electoral general assembly, which was held on Saturday 25 October 2014 in Tunis.
He was also selected Mr. Gamal Allam, a head of the Egyptian Football Association as a vice-president of the UNAF unanimously. On the other hand, the General Assembly approved in particular on the administrative and financial reports of the UNAF as well as the adoption of the estimated budget of the Union project for the year 2015 and the report of the Finance Committee meeting held on 23 October 2014. The program was approved on the North African Union's activities for the year 2015.

Board of directors

Current board of directors

Former presidents

Member associations
UNAF has 5 member associations. All associations were founding members of UNAF. All of them are members of the Confederation of African Football and the Union of Arab Football Associations (UAFA).

Competitions

UNAF runs several competitions which cover men's, women's, youth, clubs and futsal.

Current title holders

Defunct competitions

Major tournament records

Legend

 – Champions
 – Runners-up
 – Third place
 – Fourth place
QF – Quarter-finals (1934–1938, 1954–1970, and 1986–present: knockout round of 8)
GS – Group stage
R2 – Round 2 (1974–1978, second group stage, top 8; 1982: second group stage, top 12; 1986–present: knockout round of 16)
R1 – Round 1

Q – Qualified for upcoming tournament
 – Qualified but withdrew
 – Did not qualify
 – Did not enter / Withdrew / Banned
 – Hosts
 – Not affiliated in FIFA

For each tournament, the number of teams in each finals tournament (in brackets) are shown.

FIFA World Cup

Firsts
1934:  first African team to qualify for the World Cup
1970:  first African team to draw a match in the World Cup
1978:  first African team to win a match in the World Cup
1982:  first African team to win two matches in the World Cup
1986:  first African team to qualify two consecutive World Cups
1986:  first African team to reach the knockout stage (round of sixteen)
2022:  first African team to reach the semi-finals

Olympic Games For Men

Africa Cup of Nations

African Nations Championship

FIFA Futsal World Cup

Africa Futsal Cup of Nations

Former tournaments

FIFA Confederations Cup

Rankings

Men's national teams
Rankings are calculated by FIFA.

 Last updated 23 June 2022

Women's national teams
Rankings are calculated by FIFA based on matches played over the last four years.

Last updated 17 october 2022

Men's national beach soccer teams

Last updated 17 december 2021

Women's national beach soccer teams

Last updated 15december 2021

Men's national futsal teams

Last updated 23 July 2022

Controversy
On 19 November 2009, the Egyptian Football Association withdrew its membership citing the incidents that accompanied the playoff between Egypt and Algeria, but returned in 2011.

See also

Confederation of African Football (CAF)
Central African Football Federations' Union (UNIFFAC)
Council for East and Central Africa Football Associations (CECAFA)
Council of Southern Africa Football Associations (COSAFA)
West African Football Union (WAFU)

References

External links
 Official website 

 
Football
Sports organizations established in 2005
Confederation of African Football
Association football governing bodies in Africa